Abacus Data is a Canadian polling and market research firm based in Ottawa, Ontario. It was founded in August 2010, soon after its founder David Coletto graduated from the University of Calgary with a PhD in political science.

The company's surveys and political opinion polls are sometimes cited in Canadian news media, including The Globe and Mail, the National Post, the Toronto Star, and Sun Media newspapers.

In 2013, Bruce Anderson joined Abacus Data as Chairman.

During the COVID-19 pandemic, Abacus Data led the Faster Together initiative to conduct market research about vaccine hesitancy and to promote acceptance of COVID-19 vaccines.

References

External links

 Company website
 Company blog
 
 
 

Market research companies of Canada
Companies based in Ottawa